Framed is a song written by Jerry Leiber and Mike Stoller. It was originally recorded by The Robins in August, 1954, in Los Angeles and released on Leiber and Stoller's label Spark Records in October of that year as the B side of Loop De Loop Mambo.  Jerry Leiber talks about the song, saying, “Another rap took the form of a police drama.  We called it “Framed” and gave it a subtext that, despite the humor, refers to the legal brutality that impacted the black community.”

Personnel 

 Billy Richards, Roy Richards, Ty Tyrell, Bobby Nunn, Carl Gardner, vocals 
 Mike Stoller, piano
 Gil Bernal, saxophone
 Barney Kessell, guitar
 Ralph Hamilton, bass
 Jesse Sailes, drums
In 1955, the Robins disagreed over whether to remain on the West Coast or sign with Atlantic Records and move to the East Coast. This led to a split within the group. Music producers and songwriters Jerry Leiber and Mike Stoller took former Robins members Nunn and Carl Gardner, recruited singers Leon Hughes and Billy Guy, and formed the Coasters. The founding Richards brothers and Tyrell continued to record as the Robins until 1961.

Other versions
The song has been covered by Ritchie Valens (1958), the Sensational Alex Harvey Band (1972) and Cheech & Chong (with some lyrics changed, 1976).

References

1954 songs
Songs written by Jerry Leiber and Mike Stoller
The Coasters songs
Ritchie Valens songs
American rhythm and blues songs
Songs about police brutality